The women's individual compound competition at the 2007 World Archery Championships took place in July 2007 in Leipzig, Germany. 73 archers entered the competition. Following a qualifying FITA round, the archers were placed into a 7-round knockout round, drawn according to their qualification round scores, with the top 55 qualifiers receiving a bye to the second round. The semi-finals and finals then took place on 15 July.

Qualifying
The following archers were the leading 16 qualifiers:

Finals

References

2007 World Archery Championships
World